Daniela Sbrollini (born 30 September 1971) is an Italian politician.

Biography
Born in Latiano, Sbrollini was elected deputy at the Italian parliament in 2008 and in 2013 with the Democratic Party. In 2018, she was elected to the Italian Senate.

In 2019 she joined Italia Viva, the political party founded by Matteo Renzi.

In 2020, Sbrollini became the official candidate of Italia Viva and the Italian Socialist Party for the office of President of Veneto at the 2020 regional election, winning 0,62% of the votes.

References

External links 

Italian Parliament - Daniela Sbrollini

1971 births
Living people
Politicians of Veneto
People from the Province of Brindisi
Democrats of the Left politicians
Democratic Party (Italy) politicians
Italia Viva politicians
Deputies of Legislature XVI of Italy
Deputies of Legislature XVII of Italy
Senators of Legislature XVIII of Italy
Politicians of Apulia
21st-century Italian women politicians
20th-century Italian women
Women members of the Chamber of Deputies (Italy)
Women members of the Senate of the Republic (Italy)